The following is the orders, decorations, and medals given by Raja of Perlis. When applicable, post-nominal letters and non-hereditary titles are indicated.

Order of precedence for the wearing of order insignias, decorations, and medals 
Precedence:

Orders, decorations, and medals 

The Most Esteemed Royal Family Order of Perlis - Darjah Kerabat Diraja Perlis Yang Amat Dihormati
 Founded by Raja Syed Sirajuddin on 17 May 2001. 
 Awarded in a single class, without any title attached and at the personal discretion of the ruler - D.K.P.

The Most Esteemed Perlis Family Order of the Gallant Prince Syed Putra Jamalullail - Darjah Kerabat Perlis Baginda Tuanku Syed Putra Jamalullail Yang Amat Dihormati
 Founded by Raja Syed Putra on 21 September 1965 as a family order limited to members of the Perlis and allied Royal families. 
 Awarded in a single class, Darjah Kerabat - D.K.

The Order of Dato’ Bendahara Sri Jamalullail - Darjah Kebesaran Dato’ Bendahara Sri Jamalullail
 Founded by Raja Syed Sirajuddin in 2006 as a special decoration of honour for distinguished statesmen. 
 Awarded in a single class with the personal title of Dato’ Sri Diraja Bendahara Negara - D.B.S.J.

The Most Esteemed Order of the Gallant Prince Syed Sirajuddin Jamalullail - Darjah Kebesaran Baginda Tuanku Syed Sirajuddin Jamalullail Yang Amat Dihormati 
 Founded by Raja Syed Sirajuddin in 2001 
 Awarded in three classes :
 1. Knight Grand Companion or Sri Setia with the title of Dato’ Sri Diraja - S.S.S.J.
 2. Knight Companion or Dato’ Setia - D.S.S.J.
 3. Knight Commander or Dato’ Setia Panglima - D.S.P.J.

The Order of Prince Syed Sirajuddin Jamalullail of Perlis - Darjah Kebesaran Tuanku Syed Sirajuddin Jamalullail Perlis
 Founded by Raja Syed Sirajuddin in 2005 
 Awarded in four classes : 
 1. Knight Grand Companion or Setia Paduka with the title of Dato’ Sri Diraja - S.P.S.J.
 2. Dato’ Wira - D.W.S.J.
 3. Knight Commander or Dato’ Panglima - D.P.S.J.
 4. Companion or Sri - S.S.P.

The Most Esteemed Order of the Gallant Prince Syed Putra Jamalullail - Darjah Kebesaran Baginda Tuanku Syed Putra Jamalullail Yang Amat Dihormati 
 Founded by Raja Syed Putra on 22 June 1995. 
 Awarded in three classes :
 1. Knight Grand Companion or Dato’ Sri Setia with the title of Dato’ Sri Diraja - S.S.P.J.
 2. Knight Companion or Dato’ Setia - D.S.P.J.
 3. Knight Commander or Dato’ Paduka - D.P.P.J.
Made obsolete in 2001 but appointments revived in 2007.

The Most Illustrious Order of the Crown of Perlis, the Star of Safi - Darjah Kebesaran Mahkota Perlis Yang Amat Mulia, Bintang al-Safi 
 Founded by Raja Syed Putra on 21 September 1965. 
 Awarded in five classes :
 1. Knight Grand Commander or Dato’ Sri Paduka with the title of Dato’ Sri Diraja - S.P.M.P.
 2. Knight Commander or Dato’ Paduka - D.P.M.P.
 3. Companion or Setia - S.M.P.
 4. Member or Ahli - A.M.P.
 5. A silver medal (Pingat - P.M.P.) was instituted on 22 June 1995 to recognise the services of grade 3 departmental heads and community leaders of equivalent rank.

The Order for Dato’ Titleholders - Darjah Dato’ Bergelar
 Founded by Raja Syed Putra on 27 December 1987 to accompany the award of certain titular honours, namely:

Awarded in a single class, a silver-gilt badge enamelled in blue suspended from a broad, blue, silk riband with a gold central band, worn in the same manner as the sash of a grand cross.

Conspicuous Gallantry Medal - Pingat Keberanian Handal
 Instituted by Raja Syed Putra on 9 May 1951 to reward conspicuous acts of gallantry of the highest order. 
 Awarded in a single class, a silver medal - P.K.H.

Distinguished Conduct Medal - Pingat Pekerti Terpilih
 Instituted by Raja Syed Putra on 9 May 1951 as a reward for distinguished conduct. 
 Awarded in a single class, a bronze medal - P.P.T.

Meritorious Service Medal - Pingat Jasa Kebaktian
 Instituted by Raja Syed Putra on 9 May 1951 as a reward for meritorious services in state employ, for those employed in state service in civil service grades three to seven. 
 Awarded in a single class, a bronze medal - P.J.K.

Meritorious Conduct Medal - Pingat Jasa Baik
 Instituted by Raja Syed Putra on 30 May 1968 as a reward for meritorious conduct in state employ, for those employed in state service in civil service grades eight to eleven. 
 Awarded in a single class, a bronze medal - P.J.B.

Long Service Medal - Pingat Perkhidmatan Lama
 Instituted by Raja Syed Putra on 4 July 1962 as a reward for twenty-five years of long service in state employ. 
 Awarded in a single class, a silver medal - P.P.L.

See also 

 Orders, decorations, and medals of the Malaysian states and federal territories#Perlis
 List of post-nominal letters (Perlis)

References 

 
Perlis